Herve Bostan Amani  (born 11 October 1997) is an Ivorian professional footballer who plays as a forward for Anagennisi Deryneia.

Club career
Born in Broma, a village in west-central Ivory Coast, Amani spent a period in his early career with Togolese side Entente, before he moved to Serbia in summer 2017. In August same year, he signed three-and-a-half year professional contract with the Serbian SuperLiga side Javor Ivanjica. Shortly after, Amani moved on six-month loan deal to Radnički Kragujevac. He made his professional debut in 2nd fixture match of the 2017–18 Serbian First League campaign, joining the game from the bench in 1–0 away victory over Metalac Gornji Milanovac.

In July 2021, Amani joined Anagennisi Deryneia FC. However, as of 2 January 2022, he still hadn't played any official game for the club.

Career statistics

Club

References

External links
Herve Amani at KTFF

1997 births
Living people
Ivorian footballers
Association football forwards
Ivorian expatriate footballers
FK Javor Ivanjica players
FK Radnički 1923 players
Çetinkaya Türk S.K. players
Anagennisi Deryneia FC players
Serbian First League players
Serbian SuperLiga players
Ivorian expatriate sportspeople in Togo
Ivorian expatriate sportspeople in Northern Cyprus
Ivorian expatriate sportspeople in Serbia
Expatriate footballers in Togo
Expatriate footballers in Serbia
Expatriate footballers in Northern Cyprus